Hyperlopha is a genus of moths of the family Erebidae. The genus was erected by George Hampson in 1895.

Description
Palpi with second joint reaching above vertex of head. Third joint long and naked. Antennae with long cilia and bristles in male. Thorax with a high sharp tuft found behind collar. Abdomen smoothly scaled. Tibia slightly hairy. Forewings with arched costa. Apex acute and produced. Hindwings with rounded outer margin. Vein 5 from near middle of discocellulars.

Species
Hyperlopha amicta Turner, 1903 northern Queensland
Hyperlopha aridela Turner, 1902 Queensland
Hyperlopha bigoti Berio, 1971 Indochina
Hyperlopha catenata Berio, 1971 Indochina
Hyperlopha compactilis (Swinhoe, 1890) Myanmar, Peninsular Malaysia, Taiwan
Hyperlopha cristifera (Walker, 1865) Ceylon, Andamans, Kei, Hiamalayas
Hyperlopha crucifera Holloway, 2005 Borneo
Hyperlopha discontenta (Walker, 1864) Thailand, Peninsular Malaysia, Sumatra, Borneo
Hyperlopha flavipennis Holloway, 1976 Borneo, Peninsular Malaysia
Hyperlopha didyana Viette, 1968 Madagascar
Hyperlopha flexuosa Viette, 1968 Madagascar
Hyperlopha ralambo Viette, 1968 Madagascar
Hyperlopha rectefasciata (Kenrick, 1917) Madagascar

References

External links
Image: 

Calpinae
Moth genera